The Hunter Xcite (English: Excite), also called the Hunter Xcite 10, is an American sailing dinghy that was designed by the Hunter Design Team and first built in 2003.

Production
The design was built by Hunter Marine in the United States, but it is now out of production.

Design
The Hunter Xcite is an unsinkable recreational sailboat, built from a sandwich panel of thermoformed UV-protected plastic, with fiberglass mat and injected foam. It has a free-standing catboat rig, a raked stem, an open self-draining reverse transom, a transom-hung rudder controlled by a tiller and tiller extension and a folding centerboard. It displaces  and can be transported on an automobile roof rack.

The boat has no provisions for an outboard motor.

Factory standard equipment included a two piece anodized aluminum mast and boom. Factory options included a launching dolly and a larger  "turbo" mainsail.

See also
List of sailing boat types

Similar sailboats
Laser (dinghy)
Laser Pico

References

External links
Official brochure on Archive.org

2000s sailboat type designs
Dinghies
Sailboat type designs by Hunter Design Team
Sailboat types built by Hunter Marine